Pramatha Ranjan Thakur (1902 – 28 Decembder 1990) was an Indian politician elected as a member of the West Bengal Legislative Assembly from the Hanskhali constituency in the 1962 elections as a candidate of the Indian National Congress. The seat was reserved for candidates from the Scheduled Castes.

Early life
Thakur was born at village of Orakandi in Faridpur District of Bengal Presidency. His father name is Shashi Bhushan Thakur. He passed Bar at Law from London and was called to the bar from Lincoln's Inn in June, 1929. Thakur was the first barrister from the Namasudra community. In 1933, he married Binapani Devi Thakur.

Career
Thakur was a prominent member of the Namasudra community, whose great-grandfather, Harichand Thakur (1811/12-1878), had founded the Hindu religious sect called Matua Mahasangha. The sect, which was further developed by Pramatha's grandfather, Guruchand Thakur, became a focal point for the Namasudra community's efforts for social upliftment and by the 1930s Pramatha had become its head. The Namasudras had been historically considered an untouchable community. He became the Minister of State for Tribal Development of West Bengal in 1963.

References

1902 births
1990 deaths
Indian National Congress politicians from West Bengal
Members of the West Bengal Legislative Assembly
Matua people
Members of Lincoln's Inn